
Gmina Przechlewo is a rural gmina (administrative district) in Człuchów County, Pomeranian Voivodeship, in northern Poland.

Villages
Gmina Przechlewo contains the villages and settlements of Czosnowo, Dąbrowa Człuchowska, Dobrzyń, Dolinka, Garbek, Jarzębnik, Jemielno, Kleśnik, Koprzywnica, Krasne, Lipczynek, Lisewo, Łubianka, Miroszewo, Nowa Brda, Nowa Wieś Człuchowska, Nowiny, Pakotulsko, Pawłówko, Płaszczyca, Przechlewko, Przechlewko-Leśniczówka, Przechlewo, Rudniki, Sąpolno, Suszka, Szczytno, Szyszka, Trzęsacz, Wandzin, Wiśnica, Zawada, Zdrójki and Żołna.

Neighbouring gminas
Gmina Przechlewo is bordered by the gminas of Człuchów, Koczała, Konarzyny, Lipnica and Rzeczenica.

References
Polish official population figures 2006

Przechlewo
Człuchów County